The president of the Economic Chamber was the presiding officer of the Economic Chamber of the Federal Assembly of Yugoslavia.

Office-holders
Osman Karabegović
Petar Zecević
Vasil Grivčev

Sources
Various editions of The Europa World Year Book

Economic Chamber, Presidents
Yugoslavia, Economic Chamber